Martin Lukeman (born 26 March 1985) is a professional English darts player who plays in Professional Darts Corporation events. He enjoys clay pigeon shooting and is a skilled marksman.

Career
He managed to reach the last 16 of the 2017 UK Open. After last-leg wins against Matt Padgett and Rob Hewson, he defeated Chris Dobey 10–5 in the fourth round, before losing 10–3 to Ian White in the fifth round.

Lukeman secured a two-year PDC Tour Card at UK Qualifying School in February 2021, sealing his professional status with a day to spare.

Lukeman reached his maiden PDC European Tour final at the 2022 German Darts Grand Prix by defeating Adam Gawlas, Gabriel Clemens, Keane Barry, Martin Schindler and Damon Heta. He faced Luke Humphries in the final, and he was beaten 8–2.

World Championship results

PDC
 2023: Second round (lost to Martin Schindler 1–3)

Performance timeline

PDC

PDC European Tour

References

External links

1985 births
Living people
Professional Darts Corporation current tour card holders
English darts players
People from Watford